Edward Henry Heinemann (March 14, 1908 – November 26, 1991) was a military aircraft designer for the Douglas Aircraft Company.

Biography
Heinemann was born in Saginaw, Michigan. He moved to California as a boy and was raised in Los Angeles. A self-taught engineer, he joined Douglas Aircraft as a draftsman in 1926, but was laid off within a year.  After stints at International Aircraft, Moreland Aircraft, and the first Northrop Corporation, Heinemann rejoined Douglas after it acquired Northrop. Heinemann became Douglas's Chief Engineer in 1936. He remained with the company through 1960, when he left to join Guidance Technology. In 1962 he joined General Dynamics as Corporate Vice President of Engineering.  In this position he oversaw the development of the F-16.  He retired in 1973.

The famed airplane designer Burt Rutan would list Heinemann as among the leading pioneers in aviation who had inspired him to become an aerospace engineer.

His approach to aircraft design was uncomplicated, once saying that he simply took the most powerful engine available and designed the aircraft around it.

Designs
During his long career at Douglas, Heinemann designed more than 20 combat aircraft, primarily for the U.S. Navy, including many that became legends in aviation history. His designs included the following aircraft:

 SBD Dauntless dive bomber
 A-20 Havoc light bomber/attack aircraft
 A-26 Invader light bomber/attack aircraft
 A-1 Skyraider attack aircraft
 A-3 Skywarrior bomber
 A-4 Skyhawk light bomber
 F3D Skyknight night fighter
 F4D Skyray carrier-based fighter aircraft
 Douglas Skystreak and Douglas Skyrocket research aircraft

One of the first aircraft to be designed by Heinemann was the Moreland M-1 Trainer of 1929, a braced-wing parasol wing monoplane. Due to the 1929 recession only a small number were sold before the company ceased trading in 1933.

Awards and medals
 1953: Collier Trophy (for the F4D Skyray)
 1978: Guggenheim Medal
 1981: National Aviation Hall of Fame 
1982: International Air & Space Hall of Fame
 1983: National Medal of Science

The Naval Air Systems Command awards the Edward H. Heinemann Award annually to an individual or group that makes a significant contribution to aircraft design.

References

Further reading
 
 Edward H. Heinemann and Rosario Rausa, "Ed Heinemann – Combat Aircraft Designer",

External links
Heinemann biography at Skyhawk Association site
 Edward Henry Heinemann Personal Papers, San Diego Air and Space Museum Library and Archives
 Edward Henry Heinemann (Photo Collection), Flickr, San Diego Air and Space Museum Archives

1908 births
1991 deaths
People from Saginaw, Michigan
American aerospace engineers
National Medal of Science laureates
National Aviation Hall of Fame inductees
20th-century American engineers